Rajit Gadh is a Professor of Mechanical and Aerospace Engineering at the UCLA Henry Samueli School of Engineering and Applied Science and the founding director of the UCLA Smart Grid Energy Research Center (SMERC), the UCLA Wireless Internet for Mobile Enterprise Consortium (WINMEC), and the Connected and Autonomous Electric Vehicles Consortium (CAEV).

Personal and early life 
A native of India, Gadh graduated from Loyola High School, Jamshedpur, and La Martiniere High School, Calcutta. He received his bachelor's degree in engineering at the Indian Institute of Technology Kanpur (IIT) and a M.S. degree in engineering at Cornell University. He went on to complete a Ph.D. in Engineering at Carnegie Mellon University (CMU), focusing on CAD/CAM, Feature Recognition, Computational Geometry, Artificial Intelligence/Robotics, and Visualization.

Career 
Gadh has over 25 years of experience in research and development, leading technology teams to investigate and develop advanced technologies and products. He is currently a professor at UCLA and the director of UCLA's Smart Grid Energy Research Center (SMERC), which focuses on researching and developing innovative technologies for the next generation electric utility grid.

Prior to UCLA, Gadh taught for seven years at the University of Wisconsin-Madison as an assistant, associate and full professor. He has also been a visiting researcher at Stanford University where he did his sabbatical from 1999 to 2000, and at the University of California, Berkeley where he served for a year after completing his doctorate degree.

Since 2004, Gadh has served on the editorial board of Computers in Entertainment. He is also on the editorial board for the International Journal of Internet Manufacturing and Services (IJIMS) and the advisory board for Los Angeles Cleantech Incubator.

Awards and honors
Rajit Gadh received the Ralph R. Teetor Research and Educational Award from the Society of Automotive Engineers (SAE) in 1993, Eastman Kodak - ASME Best Technical Paper Award from ASME Design Automation Conference in 1993, ALCOA Science Support Scholar from ALCOA Foundation in 1993 & 1994, Research Initiation Award from the National Science Foundation (NSF) in 1994, Early CAREER Award from NSF in 1995, Research Initiation Award from the Engineering Foundation in 1994, Lucent Industrial Ecology Fellow from AT&T in 1996, Lucent Industrial Ecology Award  from NSF in 1997, and the William Mong Visiting Research Fellowship in Engineering from the University of Hong Kong in 2008. In 2013, along with several UCLA SMERC team members, he also received the Best Paper (Bronze) award at the 2013 IEEE International Conference on RFID Technologies and Applications. He received from IEEE in 2021 an award for outstanding contributions to the IEEE's Power and Energy Society Chapter and the Southern California Community.

He is a fellow of the American Society of Mechanical Engineers (ASME).

Media 

On September 24th, 2022, Professor Rajit Gadh was cited in article about how smart grids could enable 100% renewable energy.

On September 9th, 2022, Los Angeles tech and startup news publication dot.LA featured Professor Rajit Gadh in an article about how innovators are helping reduce energy consumption in the area. 

In September 2022, Professor Gadh was interviewed by The Washington Post and Spectrum News 1 about the record breaking California heat wave and resulting record energy demand.  

In April 2022, Diversity in Action Magazine published an article featuring interviews with Professor Rajit Gadh about the Smart Grid of the future. 

On March 23, 2022, ABC News interviewed Dr. Rajit Gadh about the danger posed by a threatened Russian cyber attack on the power grid amidst the war in Ukraine. 

On October 20, 2021, in collaboration with the Gardena Bus transit agency, the following joint press release was published by MOEV Inc. (http://www.moevinc.com), a startup co-founded by Dr. Rajit Gadh - https://apnews.com/press-release/newswire/technology-business-california-software-los-angeles-956005c3f012f47d0eec0fce7c6f9c7f

On September 13, 2021, The Los Angeles Business Journal featured an interview with Dr. Rajit Gadh in an article on the importance of developing charging infrastructure in multifamily homes.

In September 2021, Dr. Rajit Gadh, lectured on applications in stationary storage and electric vehicles as part of the Stanford Masters Course for The Future of Renewable Electricity Production and Storage.

On August 4, 2021, Dr. Rajit Gadh spoke at the  Electric Program Investment Charge (EPIC) Forum: Innovative Technologies to Accelerate MHD Vehicle Electrification which informed about future EPIC Investments, addressed current advancements in MHD vehicle electrification, and explored opportunities for accelerating electrification of vehicles in larger weight classes with innovative grid technologies.

In June 2021, Dr. Rajit Gadh was interviewed by The Hill about the challenges facing the electric grid during record heat in the early summer for the Western United States.

On February 17, 2021, Dr. Rajit Gadh was interviewed by CBS news about the overwhelmed power grid and deep freeze in Texas.

On December 4, 2020, Rajit Gadh spoke at 3rd Global Re-Invest Expo on California's state bill 100 which targets to make the state powered by 100 percent renewable energy by 2035. He commented on the idea of implementing V2G (Vehicles to Grid) charging stations for vehicles at UCLA and expressed optimism about the dropping cost of E-vehicles.

In July 2019, Rajit Gadh was interviewed on NBC talks and i24 News talks about the New York City power outage earlier that month on July 13, 2019. Gadh discussed the current best practices of avoiding power outages that can be applied on city-wide scales.

On March 8, 2019, Rajit Gadh was quoted in a Fast Company article about his research. In it, he talked about the problem facing vehicle to grid integration, namely the integration into the consumer market which will require time.

In December 2017, Rajit Gadh has been selected by the India Energy Storage Alliance (IESA) Advisory Committee amongst 50 Indians who have contributed to growth of the Energy Storage and Micro-grid industry. A special issue of "Emerging Technology News" – the Quarterly Magazine of IESA – will acknowledge the contribution of Indians or People of Indian origin in the Global Energy Storage & Microgrid space.

In July 2017, Rajit Gadh, was quoted in the San Gabriel Valley Tribune article about solar farming on a large ranch. Gadh discussed the amount of space needed per megawatt of solar energy.

In November 2016, SMERC director, Rajit Gadh, was quoted in FastCodeDesign article on Tesla's latest product. The article discusses how Tesla's new solar roof power energy can feed Tesla car batteries which in turn feed Tesla energy facilities. They could also potentially feed into backup battery plants made up of older batteries.

In May 2015, Rajit Gadh appeared in two videos titled "Smart Meters - The Critical Element" and "What is Demand Response(DR)?". Part of a 6 video series, LA Smart Grid, released by the Los Angeles Department of Water and Power that covers a range of topics such as: the energy problem, smart grid and sustainability, smart meters, demand response, electric vehicles, and energy efficiency.

In January 2014, General Motors "Drive the District" ran an article on Dr. Gadh's ongoing research on the future of electric vehicle charging. Later that year on May 31, Dr. Gadh participated in a panel, hosted by Los Angeles Mayor Eric Garcetti, called "Mobility and Future of Transportation in Los Angeles." In September, SMERC participated in the National Drive Electric Week 2014 event held at UCLA. Guest speakers included Rajit Gadh, along with Paul Scott (Plug In America co-founder), Ed Begley Jr., and Susana M. Reyes (Senior Analyst, Office of Los Angeles Mayor Eric Garcetti) who proclaimed the week of September 15–21, 2014 as National Drive Electric Week in the City of Los Angeles.

On November 15, 2013, UCLA announced its first of six Grand Challenges Project, "Thriving in a Hotter Los Angeles", whose goal is to make the Los Angeles region 100% sustainable in water and energy by 2050. Gadh and his team at SMERC, along with other faculty, centers, and staff will be involved in this Grand Challenge.

Dr. Gadh was featured amongst a select number of faculty who are "groundbreakers" in UCLA's recent media campaign "The Optimists". Other notable figures in the campaign include John Wooden, Francis Ford Coppola, Terence Tao, Jackie Robinson, and James Dean.

Rajit Gadh was interviewed by The Huffington Post about the origin of wireless technology, how it works and where it is headed. He was also interviewed by World Politics Review and Southern California Public Radio about the massive blackouts in India on 30 and 31 of July 2012, the largest power outage in history, and was also interviewed by the BBC about the Great Blackout of 2011 that affected parts of Southern California and Arizona, the largest blackout in California history.

Gadh has also been interviewed by other news outlets about various topics such as RFID technology by ZDNet, smart grid technology by MIT Technology Review, Technology Marketing Corp., and Glendale New-Press,  LED technology by BizAsiaTechnology, and the Hurricane Sandy power outages by Popular Mechanics. He was recently quoted in a Toronto Star article, "How electricity has the power to transform the lives of girls around the world ", talking about new technologies being developed to allow homes to feed energy back into the grid.

Research and Publications 
He has over 200 published papers, given keynotes and lectures to numerous conferences, and has five patents granted.

Select Keynotes & Speaking Events 

Gave keynote talk on "Emerging eMobility Infrastructure" at 2022 Conference on Clean Energy and Smart Grid (CCESG), November 5, 2022. 

Keynote Address on Electrification of Transportation, Smart Charging and Grid Impacts at Advanced Energy Research and Development Center (AERDC) Conference, June 9, 2021

Served as Panelist on protecting the grid for Vermont Journal of Environmental Law 2020 Climate Symposium, October 16, 2020

Workshop on Technology Trends in Transportation and Electricity, California State Capitol Building, Sacramento, CA, October 2019

Electric Vehicles and Autonomous Vehicles - a joint event organized by UCLA and Shanghai Jiaotong University June 2019

Electric and Autonomous Transportation UCLA CAEV (Connected Autonomous Electric Vehicle) Annual Conference March 2019

Gave a seminar at ITT Delhi on Electric Vehicles and Microgrids, December 2018 

Distributed Energy Resources (DER) - EV, PV and Storage - for a Modern Grid, May 2018

Named by IESA (India Energy Storage Alliance) one of the "50 most influential Indians in Energy Storage and Micro-grids", December 13, 2017

San Gabriel Valley Chancellor's Society Event, October 11, 2017,

ASME 2017 Energy Sustainability (ES) Conference, Charlotte, NC, 28–29 June 2017

The Electric Vehicle-Utility Industry Nexus, San Diego, CA, 2–3 November 2016

The Smart Grid Living Lab At UCLA, And Its Automated Demand Response Program, 4 May 2016

Lighting The Way: Getting Smart About Electricity, 18 April 2016

6th Annual Next-Generation Energy Storage 2016, 14–16 February 2016

2016 UCLA-Tata Global Forum, 11–12 January 2016

2015 Transmission & Distribution Summit, Houston, TX， 1–3 November 2015

Regional Pravasi Bharatiya Divas (RPBD) Los Angeles 2015, 14 November 2015

NCPA Annual Conference 2015, 30 September - 2 October 2015

Panel Speaker, 2015 10th Annual AltCar Expo, 18 September 2015

Panel Speaker, The US-India Cleantech Opportunity – Global Workshop, 26 June 2015

Panel Speaker, The 2nd Annual UCLA Energy Innovation Conference: Transforming an Industry, 1 May 2015

Panel Speaker, RE-Invest 1st Renewable Energy Global Investors Meet & Expo, 15–17 February 2015

Speaker, Energy Thought Summit (ETS) 2014, 24–25 March 2014

Panel Speaker, Smart Grid: Get Plugged In!, 13 November 2013

2013 AltCar Expo & Conference, 20 September 2013

Speaker, California Energy Commission (CEC) Staff Workshop on the State's Role in Supporting Interoperability of Electric Vehicle Supply Equipment (EVSE), 15 August 2013 

ISGMA 2013, International Symposium on Green Manufacturing and Applications, 25–29 June 2013

Plenary speaker, 2013 FREEDM Systems Center Annual Industry Review and Conference, 12–13 February 2013

Plenary speaker, India Electricity 2013, 16–18 January 2013

Panel speaker, Milken Institute Summit - California 2012: "Renewables: Our Energy Edge?", November 15, 2012

HotPower '12 - 2012 Workshop on Power-Aware Computing and Systems, October 7, 2012

2nd Annual IEEE Energy Efficiency Symposium, October 4, 2012

MobiCom 2011, The 17th Annual International Conference on Mobile Computing and Network, September 20, 2011

Smart Grid Virtual Summit: Winter 2011, February 24, 2011,

Distribution Technology & Innovation Summit, July 15, 2010,

MobiCase 2009: The International Conference on Mobile Computing, Applications, and Services, October 26, 2009

DCOSS '09 The 5th IEEE International Conference on Distributed Computing in Sensor Systems, June 9, 2009

Raytheon's Innovation Café, February 19, 2009

The Dizzying Convergence Of Electronic Devices And Services - What Are The Opportunities For Entrepreneurs?, Caltech/MIT Enterprise Forum, May 12, 2007
d
Associazionne Italiana di Logistica e di Supply Chain Management, June 2005

RFID: Wirelessly Tracking Objects From Cradle to Grave, April 20, 2005

X meeting of the telecom Industry, Defining the basis for a solid expansion, May 25, 2004,

Third Annual Wireless Ventures Conference by Dow Jones VenutreWire, April 22, 2004

LOMA Emerging Technology Conference, September 3, 2003

Select Publications 
Cao, Zhiyuan, Yubo Wang, Chi-Cheng Chu, and Rajit Gadh. "Robust pseudo-measurement modeling for three-phase distribution systems state estimation." Electric Power Systems Research 180 (2020): 106138.

Majidpour, Mostafa, Hamidreza Nazaripouya, Peter Chu, Hemanshu R. Pota, and Rajit Gadh. "Fast Univariate Time Series Prediction of Solar Power for Real-Time Control of Energy Storage System." Forecasting 1, no. 1 (2019): 107–120.

Chung, Yu-Wei, Behnam Khaki, Tianyi Li, Chicheng Chu, and Rajit Gadh. "Ensemble machine learning-based algorithm for electric vehicle user behavior prediction." Applied Energy 254 (2019): 113732.

Nazaripouya, Hamidreza, Hemanshu Roy Pota, Chi-Cheng Chu, and Rajit Gadh. "Real-Time Model-Free Coordination of Active and Reactive Powers of Distributed Energy Resources to Improve Voltage Regulation in Distribution Systems." IEEE Transactions on Sustainable Energy (2019).

Khaki, Behnam, Yu-Wei Chung, Chicheng Chu, and Rajit Gadh. "Probabilistic Electric Vehicle Load Management in Distribution Grids." In 2019 IEEE Transportation Electrification Conference and Expo (ITEC), pp. 1–6. IEEE, 2019.

Reeh, Devin, Francisco Cruz Tapia, Yu-Wei Chung, Behnam Khaki, Chicheng Chu, and Rajit Gadh. "Vulnerability Analysis and Risk Assessment of EV Charging System under Cyber-Physical Threats." In 2019 IEEE Transportation Electrification Conference and Expo (ITEC), pp. 1–6. IEEE, 2019.

Gadh, Rajit, Hamidreza Nazaripouya, and Chi-Cheng Chu. "Battery energy storage control systems and methods." U.S. Patent Application 16/193,048, filed May 23, 2019.

Khaki, Behnam, Chicheng Chu, and Rajit Gadh. "Hierarchical distributed framework for EV charging scheduling using exchange problem." Applied energy 241 (2019): 461–471.

Gowda, Shashank Narayana, Tianyang Zhang, Choung Jae Kim, Rajit Gadh, and Hamidreza Nazaripouya. "Transmission, Distribution deferral and Congestion relief services by Electric Vehicles." In 2019 IEEE Power & Energy Society Innovative Smart Grid Technologies Conference (ISGT), pp. 1–5. IEEE, 2019.

Cao, Minjian, Qingshan Xu, Hamidreza Nazaripouya, Chi-Cheng Chu, Hemanshu R. Pota, and Rajit Gadh. "Engineering energy storage sizing method considering the energy conversion loss on facilitating wind power integration." IET Generation, Transmission & Distribution 13, no. 9 (2018): 1693–1699.

Khaki, Behnam, Yu-Wei Chung, Chicheng Chu, and Rajit Gadh. "Hierarchical Distributed EV Charging Scheduling in Distribution Grids." arXiv preprint arXiv:1812.02847 (2018).

Xiong, Yingqi, Bin Wang, Chi-cheng Chu, and Rajit Gadh. "Vehicle grid integration for demand response with mixture user model and decentralized optimization." Applied energy 231 (2018): 481–493.

Zhang, Tianyang, Himanshu Pota, Chi-Cheng Chu, and Rajit Gadh. "Real-time renewable energy incentive system for electric vehicles using prioritization and cryptocurrency." Applied energy 226 (2018): 582–594.

Azar, Armin Ghasem, Hamidreza Nazaripouya, Behnam Khaki, Chi-Cheng Chu, Rajit Gadh, and Rune Hylsberg Jacobsen. "A non-cooperative framework for coordinating a neighborhood of distributed prosumers." IEEE Transactions on Industrial Informatics 15, no. 5 (2018): 2523–2534.

Xiong, Yingqi, Bin Wang, Chi-Cheng Chu, and Rajit Gadh. "Electric vehicle driver clustering using statistical model and machine learning." In 2018 IEEE Power & Energy Society General Meeting (PESGM), pp. 1–5. IEEE, 2018.

Gadh, Rajit. "Demonstrating Plug-in Electric Vehicles Smart Charging and Storage Supporting the Grid." (2018).

Chung, Yu-Wei, Behnam Khaki, Chicheng Chu, and Rajit Gadh. "Electric vehicle user behavior prediction using hybrid kernel density estimator." In 2018 IEEE International Conference on Probabilistic Methods Applied to Power Systems (PMAPS), pp. 1–6. IEEE, 2018.

Khaki, Behnam, Yu-Wei Chung, Chicheng Chu, and Rajit Gadh. "Nonparametric user behavior prediction for distributed ev charging scheduling." In 2018 IEEE Power & Energy Society General Meeting (PESGM), pp. 1–5. IEEE, 2018.

Khaki, Behnam, Chicheng Chu, and Rajit Gadh. "A hierarchical admm based framework for ev charging scheduling." In 2018 IEEE/PES Transmission and Distribution Conference and Exposition (T&D), pp. 1–9. IEEE, 2018.

Xiong, Yingqi, Behnam Khakit, Chi-cheng Chu, and Rajit Gadh. "Real-Time Bi-Directional Electric Vehicle Charging Control with Distribution Grid Implementation." In 2018 IEEE/PES Transmission and Distribution Conference and Exposition (T&D), pp. 1–5. IEEE, 2018.

Cao, Zhiyuan, Chi-Cheng Chu, and Rajit Gadh. "An autonomous electric vehicle based charging system: Matching and charging strategy." In 2018 IEEE Power & Energy Society Innovative Smart Grid Technologies Conference (ISGT), pp. 1–5. IEEE, 2018.

Y Xiong, B Wang, C Chu, R Gadh, "Distributed Optimal Vehicle Grid Integration Strategy with User Behavior Prediction", 2017

W. Shi; N. Li; C. C. Chu; R. Gadh, "Real-Time Energy Management in Microgrids", IEEE Transactions on Smart Grid;8 (1), 228–238, 2017

Z Cao, YW Chung, Y Xiong, CC Chu, R Gadh, "IoT based manufacturing system with a focus on energy efficiency", Innovative Smart Grid Technologies-Asia (ISGT-Asia), 2016 IEEE, 545–552, 2016

Y Xiong, B Wang, Z Cao, C Chu, H Pota, R Gadh, "Extension of IEC61850 with smart EV charging", Innovative Smart Grid Technologies-Asia (ISGT-Asia), 2016 IEEE, 294–299, 2016

T Zhang, CC Chu, R Gadh, "A two-tier energy management system for smart electric vehicle charging in UCLA: A Solar-To-Vehicle (S2V) case study", Innovative Smart Grid Technologies-Asia (ISGT-Asia), 2016 IEEE, 288–293, 2016

Lee E-K, Shi W, Gadh R, Kim W, "Design and Implementation of a Microgrid Energy Management System", Sustainability. 2016; 8(11):1143

Wang, Y., Wang, B., Chu, C. C., Pota, H., & Gadh, R., "Energy management for a commercial building microgrid with stationary and mobile battery storage", Energy and Buildings, 116, 141-150 (2016)

Y. Wang, B. Wang, Tianyang Zhang, H. Nazaripouya, C. C. Chu and R. Gadh, "Optimal energy management for Microgrid with stationary and mobile storages", 2016 IEEE/PES Transmission and Distribution Conference and Exposition (T&D), Dallas, TX, 2016, pp. 1–5

B. Wang; Y. Wang; H. Nazaripouya; C. Qiu; C. Chu; R. Gadh, "Predictive Scheduling Framework for Electric Vehicles Considering Uncertainties of User Behaviors", IEEE Internet of Things Journal, vol. no. 99, pp. 1–1, 2016

B. Wang, R. Huang, Y. Wang, H. Nazaripouya, C. Qiu, C. Chu, R. Gadh, “Predictive Scheduling for Electric Vehicles Considering Uncertainty of Load and User Behaviors”, IEEE PES T&D Conference and Exposition, 2016

H. Nazaripouya, B. Wang, Y. Wang, P. Chu, H. R. Pota, and R. Gadh, "Univariate Time Series Prediction of Solar Power Using a Hybrid Wavelet-ARMA-NARX Prediction Method", IEEE PES T&D, Dallas, Texas, 2–5 May 2016

W. Shi, X. Xie, C. Chu, R. Gadh, "Distributed Optimal Energy Management in Microgrids," IEEE Transactions on Smart Grid, vol.6, no.3, pp. 1137–1146, May 2015

H. Nazaripouya, Y. Wang, P. Chu, H. R. Pota, and R. Gadh, "Optimal Sizing and Placement of Battery Energy Storage in Distribution System Based on Solar Size for Voltage Regulation", 2015 IEEE PES General Meeting, Denver, Colorado, 26–30 July 2015

R. Huang, Y. Wang, W. Shi, D. Yao, B. Hu, C. Chu, R. Gadh, "Integration of IEC 61850 into a Vehicle-to-Grid system with networked electric vehicles ", IEEE ISGT 2015, Washington, DC, 17–20 February 2015

B. Wang, B. Hu, C. Qiu, P. Chu, R. Gadh, "EV Charging Algorithm Implementation with User Price Preference", IEEE ISGT 2015, Washington, DC, 17–20 February 2015

M. Majidpour, C. Qiu, P. Chu, R. Gadh, H.R. Pota, "Fast Prediction for Sparse Time Series: Demand Forecast of EV Charging Stations for Cell Phone Applications ", IEEE Transactions on Industrial Informatics, 11(1), pp. 242–250, February 2015

M. Majidpour, H.R. Pota, C. Qiu, P. Chu, R. Gadh, "Modified Pattern Sequence-based Forecasting for Electric Vehicle Charging Stations", IEEE International Conference on Smart Grid Communications (SmartGridComm), Venice, Italy, 3-6 Nov. 2014

Y. Wang, O. Sheikh, B. Hu, C. Chu, R. Gadh, "Integration of V2H/V2G Hybrid System for Demand Response in Distribution Network", IEEE International Conference on Smart Grid Communications (SmartGridComm), Venice, Italy, 3-6 Nov. 2014

W. Shi, E.K. Lee, D. Yao, R. Huang, C. Chu, R.Gadh, "Evaluating Microgrid Management and Control with an Implementable Energy Management System", IEEE International Conference on Smart Grid Communications (SmartGridComm), Venice, Italy, 3-6 Nov. 2014

W. Shi, X. Xie, C. Chu, R. Gadh, "A Distributed Optimal Energy Management Strategy for Microgrids", IEEE International Conference on Smart Grid Communications (SmartGridComm), Venice, Italy, 3-6 Nov. 2014

Y. Wang, H. Nazaripouya, C. Chu, R. Gadh, H.R. Pota, "Vehicle-to-Grid Automatic Load Sharing with Driver Preference in Micro-Grids", ISGT Europe 14, Istanbul, Turkey, 12-15 Oct. 2014

H. Pota, Md. J. Hossain, Md. A. Mahmud, and R. Gadh, "Islanded Operation of Microgrids with Inverter Connected Renewable Energy Resources", Proceedings of the 19th IFAC World Congress, Cape Town, South Africa, 24–29 August 2014

M. Majidpour, C. Qiu, P. Chu, R. Gadh and H. R. Pota, "Fast Demand Forecast of Electric Vehicle Charging Stations for Cell Phone Application", Proceedings of the 2014 IEEE PES General Meeting, National Harbor, MD, USA., 27–31 July 2014

H. R. Pota, M. J. Hossain, M. A. Mahmud and R. Gadh, "Control for Microgrids with Inverter Connected Renewable Energy Resources", Proceedings of the 2014 IEEE PES General Meeting, National Harbor, MD, USA. 27–31 July 2014

R. Huang, E.-K. Lee, C. Chu, R. Gadh, "Integration of IEC 61850 into a Distributed Energy Resources System in a Smart Green Building", IEEE Power & Energy Society General Meeting, National Harbor, MD, USA., 27–31 July 2014

W. Shi, N. Li, X. Xie, C. Chu, and R. Gadh, "Optimal residential demand response in distribution networks", IEEE Journal on Selected Areas in Communications, 32(7), July 2014

C. Chung, A. Shepelev, C. Qiu, C. Chu, and R. Gadh, "Mesh Network for RFID and Electric Vehicle Monitoring in Smart Charging Infrastructure", Journal of Communications Software and Systems, 10(2), June 2014

R. Huang, Y. Wang, C. Chu, R. Gadh, Y. Song, "Optimal Configuration of Distributed Generation on Jeju Island Power Grid Using Genetic Algorithm: A Case Study", Special Issue on RFID Technologies & Internet of Things in the Journal of Communication Software and Systems, 10(2), June 2014

C. Chung, J. Chynoweth, P. Chu and R. Gadh, "Master-Slave Control Scheme in Electric Vehicle Smart Charging Infrastructure", The Scientific World Journal special issue for Power, Control, and Optimization, 18 March 2014

J. Chynoweth, C. Chung, C. Qiu, C. Chu, R. Gadh, "Smart Electric Vehicle Charging Infrastructure Overview", The Innovative Smart Grid Technologies (ISGT) Conference, Washington, DC, USA.,19–22 February 2014

C. Chung, J. Chynoweth, C. Qiu, C. Chu, R. Gadh, "Design of Fast Response Smart Electric Vehicle Charging Infrastructure", IEEE Green Energy and Systems Conference, IGESC 2013, Long Beach, U.S.A., Nov. 25, 2013

E.-K. Lee, P. Chu, and R. Gadh, "Fine-Grained Access to Smart Building Energy Resources", IEEE Internet Computing, 17(6), pp. 48–56, Nov.-Dec. 2013

C.Chung, E. Youn, J. Chynoweth, C. Qiu, C. Chu, R. Gadh, "Safety Design for Smart Electric Vehicle Charging with Current and Multiplexing Control", 2013 IEEE International Conference on Smart Grid Communications, Vancouver, Canada, 21–24 October 2013

A. Shepelev, C. Chung, C. Chu, R. Gadh, "Mesh Network Design for Smart Charging Infrastructure and Electric Vehicle Remote Monitoring", International Conference on ICT Convergence 2013, Jeju, Korea, Oct. 14–16, 2013

C. Chung, J. Chynoweth, C. Qiu, C. Chu, R. Gadh, "Design of Fair Charging Algorithm for Smart Electrical Vehicle Charging Infrastructure", International Conference on ICT Convergence 2013, Jeju, Korea, Oct. 14–16, 2013

C. Chung, A. Shepelev, C. Qiu, C. Chu, R. Gadh, "Design of RFID Mesh Network for Electric Vehicle Smart Charging Infrastructure", 2013 IEEE International Conference on RFID Technologies and Applications, IEEE RFID TA 2013, Johor Bahru, Malaysia, 4–5 September 2013 ** The Bronze Paper Award **

Ching-Yen Chung, Peter Chu, Rajit Gadh, "Design of Smart Charging Infrastructure Hardware And Firmware Design of The Various Current Multiplexing Charging System", Seventh Global Conference on Power Control and Optimization PCO 2013, Prague, August. 2013. p. 25-27

Eun-Kyu Lee, Rajit Gadh, Mario Gerla, "Energy Service Interface: Accessing to Customer Energy Resources for Smart Grid Interoperation", IEEE Journal on Select Areas in Communications (JSAC), 31(7), pp. 1195–1204, July 2013

Eun-Kyu Lee, Rajit Gadh, Mario Gerla, "Resource Centric Security to Protect Customer Energy Information in the Smart Grid", IEEE Smart Grid Communications, Taiwan, October. 2012 (Conference Paper)

Rui Huang, Tiana Huang, Rajit Gadh, Na Li, "Solar Generation Prediction using the ARMA Model in a Laboratory-level Micro-grid", Smart Grid Communications (SmartGridComm), 2012 IEEE Third International Conference on Digital Object Identifier, Nov. 5–8, 2012 Taiwan, p. 528-533

S. Mal, A. Chattopadhyay, A. Yang, R. Gadh, "Electric vehicle smart charging and vehicle-to-grid operation", International Journal of Parallel, Emergent and Distributed Systems, vol. 27, no. 3. March 2012.

Siddhartha Mal, Rajit Gadh, "Real-Time Push Middleware and Mobile Application for Electric Vehicle Smart Charging and Aggregation", Accepted for publication June 15, 2011, Special Issue on: Context-Aware System and Intelligent Middleware for Smart Grid International Journal of Communication Networks and Distributed Systems (IJCNDS) 2011.

Katina Michael, George Roussos, George Q. Huang, Arunabh Chattopadhyay, Rajit Gadh, B.S. Prabhu, Peter Chu, "Planetary-scale RFID Services in an Age of Uberveillance 98(9)", Proceedings of the IEEE, 1663-1671 (2010)

Xiaoyong Su, Chi-Cheng Chu, B.S. Prabhu, Rajit Gadh, "Creating a RFID Data Integration Framework for Enterprise Information System", Accepted for publication on International Journal of Internet Protocol Technology, v.4 n.4, p. 221-231, November 2009

Tim Coltman, Rajit Gadh, Katina Michael, "RFID and Supply Chain Management: Introduction to the Special Issue", Journal of Theoretical and Applied Electronic Commerce Research, 3(1), 2008, iii-vi

Harish Ramamurthy, B. S. Prabhu, Rajit Gadh, Asad Madni, "Wireless Industrial Monitoring and Control using a Smart Sensor Platform", IEEE Sensors Journal, 7(5), May 2007, 611-618

Xiaoyong Su, B.S. Prabhu, Chicheng Chu and Rajit Gadh, "Scalable Vector Graphics (SVG) Based Multi-Level Graphics Representation for Engineering Rich-Content Exchange in Mobile Collaboration Computing Environments", Journal of Computing and Information Science in Engineering—June 2006—Volume 6, Issue 2, pp. 96–102

Books 
Rajit Gadh (Ed.). (1993). Intelligent Concurrent Design: Fundamentals, Methodology, Modeling, and Practice. New York, NY: American Society of Mechanical Engineers

Rajit Gadh (Ed.). (1994). Concurrent Product Design. New York, NY: American Society of Mechanical Engineers

Osama M. Jadaan, Allan C. Ward, Edmund C. Feldy, Rajit Gadh, Nihon Kikai Gakkai (Eds.). (1995). 11th Biennial Conference on Reliability, Stress Analysis, and Failure Prevention. New York, NY: American Society of Mechanical Engineers

A.R. Thangaraj, Rajit Gadh, & S. Billatos (Eds.). (1995). Concurrent Product and Process Engineering. New York, NY: American Society of Mechanical Engineers

Dani, T., Gadh, R. (1998). Chapter 14: Virtual Reality - A New Technology for the Mechanical Engineer. In Kutz, M. (Ed.). Mechanical Engineering Handbook (2nd ed.). New York, NY: John Wiley & Sons.

References

External links 
 UCLA Smart Grid Energy Research Center (SMERC)
 WINSmartEV™
 UCLA Wireless Internet for Mobile Enterprise Consortium (WINMEC)
 Rajit Gadh - UCLA Mechanical and Aerospace Engineering
 UCLA WINMEC - Publications and Reports

Cornell University College of Engineering alumni
UCLA Henry Samueli School of Engineering and Applied Science faculty
Carnegie Mellon University College of Engineering alumni
Living people
Fellows of the American Society of Mechanical Engineers
University of California, Berkeley staff
People from Jamshedpur
American academics of Indian descent
Year of birth missing (living people)